The 2015 European Weightlifting Championships were held in Tbilisi, Georgia from 10 April to 18 April 2015.

Medal overview

Men

Women

Medals tables 
Ranking by all medals: "Big" (Total result) and "Small" (Snatch and Clean&Jerk)

Ranking by "Big" (Total result) medals

Participating countries
List of participating countries. In total 38 countries participate in this championships.

External links
 Official website
 Results 

European Weightlifting Championships
International sports competitions hosted by Georgia (country)
2015 in Georgian sport
Sports competitions in Tbilisi
2015 in weightlifting
Weightlifting in Georgia (country)